Noxapater Creek is a stream in the U.S. state of Mississippi.

The origin of the name Noxapater is unclear.  The name supposedly is derived from the Choctaw language, and depending on source is purported to mean "little bullets" or "wide stream". Variant names are "Noxubee Creek" and "Noxupata Creek".

References

Rivers of Mississippi
Rivers of Neshoba County, Mississippi
Rivers of Winston County, Mississippi
Mississippi placenames of Native American origin